Bangou may refer to:

Bangou, Burkina Faso
Bangou, Cameroon
Bangou, Mauritania